is a Japanese singer–songwriter and actor. He was a member of Jpop idol boy band KAT-TUN from their debut until September 30, 2013 when his contract with Johnny & Associates (the company that manages KAT-TUN) was terminated. 
When he was a member of KAT-TUN, he was recognized as the rapper in the group and has a hip-hop-influenced style. Out of the other members, Tanaka was most often paired up with Yuichi Nakamaru and they even formed a comedy duo 'TaNaka'. After leaving Johnny & Associates, Tanaka formed his own indie rock band called INKT.

Biography

Early life 

Born in Chiba, Chiba prefecture; Japan on November 5, 1985, Tanaka is the second oldest of 5 siblings, all brothers and raised by their single mother. His younger brother Juri is also an actor and signed with Johnny & Associates. Juri along with Tanaka's youngest brother Subaru even appeared alongside Tanaka in the first episode of the TV series Tokkyu Tanaka 3 Go in which Tanaka played the lead role. His younger brother Hyouga is also an actor, and Tanaka's older brother is named Kazunaru.

Before Tanaka was born, his mother thought he would be a girl, so she thought of the name Maria (Saint). But he turned out to be a boy instead, so the Kanji letter of his name '聖' was kept, but its pronunciation was changed to “Kōki” (“Kōki” also means “Saint” in Japanese). Furthermore, when he was little his face was so cute and feminine that he was often mistaken for a girl.

Tanaka graduated from Horikoshi High School, and eventually went to study at Josai International University, but he quit halfway. He loves animals so much that he originally wanted to become a veterinarian.

Career
Tanaka joined Johnny & Associates in 1998 when he was only 13 years old, he once stated the reason why he applied was “My mother sent the application form behind my back. So I went to the audition without knowing anything at all. She told me it was because my cousin applied too. Therefore, we went to the audition together. But in the end, my cousin failed, while I passed.”

He became a member of Jpop idol boy band KAT-TUN from their debut in 2001 until September 30, 2013 when his contract with Johnny & Associates was terminated due to several contract violations and he left the company. In November the same year he formed his own Indie rock band called INKT and was the lead vocalist in the band, and they finally released their debut album on November 8, 2014. On September 1, 2017 it was announced on the band's website that INKT has now officially disbanded. After the band's disbandment, Tanaka still continues to release music and perform in live shows as a solo artist.

On January 23, 2019 Tanaka released his first solo album Easter under his own record label 'Project KOKI', followed by a solo national tour in Japan from February 2 to April 6, 2019. On July 31, 2019 Tanaka released his solo single Round and Round / end of begin and held a one-man solo live tour in August and a band tour in October. He then released a mini album LOUDER on October 2, 2019.

On January 5, 2020 Tanaka started his own official Youtube channel where he uploads original content often featuring him with his younger brother Hyouga.

In 2020 Tanaka announced that he would write, direct and star in his own stage show called OLD Maid-JOKER, the shows were originally scheduled to begin in June 2020 but had to be postponed due to the COVID-19 pandemic, the shows have since been rescheduled to play from April 21–25, 2021.

Since February 22, 2021 Tanaka has started a radio podcast show with his brother Hyouga called Tanaka Family Raaaaadio which broadcasts shows weekly every Sundays in Japan.

As an actor, Tanaka has appeared in a string of Japanese TV series and movies and has won 2 awards for his acting work in My Boss My Hero.

Personal life
On May 24, 2017 Tanaka was arrested for marijuana possession during a traffic stop, despite claiming the cannabis in his car were not his he was tested positive to the drug and was detained for 2 weeks while investigations were ongoing. He was eventually released from jail on June 7, on June 30 it was reported that Tanaka will not be prosecuted for marijuana possession charges as the police were not able to obtain enough evidence to prosecute him.

On February 24, 2022, Tanaka was arrested by police in Nagoya for alleged possession of methamphetamine. Tanaka has denied the allegations, and was quoted as saying that he did not know anything about the drugs.

Tanaka can play several instruments. His main instrument is the guitar; he can also play the piano and the shamisen. He wrote most of the rap lyrics for KAT-TUN's songs and his solos, going by the pen-name of "JOKER". While in INKT, he wrote all the band's songs under his name 'KOKI'.

Tanaka loves to design things and is very artistic and has a talent for sewing and he designs his own apparels.

Discography

INKT
Studio albums

Solo
Singles

Studio albums

Live performances

Concerts
This is a list of all the live concerts that Tanaka has performed at and will perform in either solo or with his rock band INKT.

{| class="wikitable"
!Year
!Concert title
!Role
!Venues and dates
|-
|2014
|INKT Fan Meeting Vol.1
|Lead performer
|Shinagawa Prince Hotel Stellar Ball; Tokyo (November 6)
|-
|rowspan="9"|2015
|INKT 1st Live ~ The Birth of INKT
|Lead performer
|TSUTAYA O-WEST; Tokyo (January 18) & BIGCAT live house; Osaka (February 21) 
|-
|INKT one-man Live ~ Painting with INKT
| Lead performer
| EX Theater Roppongi; Tokyo (May 5) 
|-
|サイサリス (Saisarisu) Tour 2015
| Lead performer
| touring 7 different cities in Japan at various venues (1 concert in each city with a total of 7 shows), from July 19 to August 7 
|-
|Muscle King Party
| Guest performer
| TSUTAYA O-WEST (August 21) 
|-
|AOMORI ROCK FESTIVAL'15 ~ summer of demon
| Guest performer
| Night Koshiyama; Aomori (September 12)
|-
|Saitama Super Arena 15th Anniversary presents "Meat Rock Festival 2015"
| Guest performer
| Saitama Super Arena; Saitama (September 13) 
|-
|GoneR Presents "Day of the Dead Vol.6"
| Guest performer
| Fushimi JAMMIN; Aichi (September 23)  
|-
|Gacharic Spin 6th Anniversary 2-Man Tour"
| Guest performer
| Nishikawaguchi LIVE HOUSE Hearts; Saitama (October 3), LIVE HOUSE J; Nagano (October 4) 
|-
|Piano Zombie vs INKT 2-Man Live
| Lead performer
| Kashiwa PALOOZA; Kashiwa, Chiba (October 25)
|-
|2015 - 2016
|Re:birth of INKT Tour 2015-2016
| Lead performer
| 8 different venues in various cities in Japan, from December 5, 2015 to January 4, 2016 
|-
|rowspan="25"|2016
|INKT / Gacharic Spin / Kamen Joshi 3-Man Live
| Lead performer
| Electric Lady Land; Nagoya (February 6) 
|-
|PALOOZA presents CIRCUIT SEX MACHINEGUNS VS INKT
| Lead performer
| Kashiwa PALOOZA (February 11) 
|-
|Summer Demon Phenomenon 2016 "ROAD TO 10th ANNIVERSARY series" INKT VS Summer Demon
| Lead performer
| Shinjuku ACB Hall; Tokyo (February 19)
|-
|INKT 2-Man Live Tour
| Lead performer
| 7 different venues in various cities in Japan, from April 2 - May 1, 2016
|-
|LOKA ~ THE ORIGINS TOUR 2016
| Lead performer
| Yokohama Club Lizard; Yokohama (May 4), Shinsaibashi Club DROP (May 21) & Nagoya HOLIDAY NEXT (May 29)
|-
|INKT FC Members-only Live 2016
| Lead performer
| Gakugeidaigaku Maple House; Tokyo (May 8)
|-
|Louder!!!!!
| Lead performer
| Shibuya THE GAME; Tokyo (May 28)
|-
|North Kanto Overheat Fire
| Lead performer
| Nagoya Fushimi JAMMIN; Aichi (June 4) & Esaka MUSE; Osaka (June 5)
|-
|INSOLENCE JAPAN TOUR 2016
| Lead performer
| Shibuya THE GAME (June 9),  Nagoya RAD HALL; Aichi (June 11) & Harbor Studio; Kobe (June 12)
|-
|PALOOZA Thanksgiving THE45th.~P Seitansai~
| Lead performer
| Kashiwa PALOOZA (July 18)
|-
|INKT SUMMER CIRCUIT Live 2016
| Lead performer
| 5 shows in Gakugeidaigaku Maple House from July 3–31
|-
|JUNGLE LIFE×CLUB251 presents “Whiteboard Jungle”
| Lead performer
| Shimokitazawa CLUB251; Tokyo (July 28)
|-
|UZMK presents "Effected ☆ fuck ups" vs America-mura DROP 13th Anniversary live
| Guest performer
| America-mura DROP; Osaka (August 7 & 8)
|-
|Muscle King Party Vol.3
| Lead performer
| TSUTAYA O-WEST (August 22)
|-
|"King Chimera" live
| Guest performer
| Shibuya Clubasia; Tokyo (September 21)
|-
|BIG BOMBER CAMP 2016 - TOKYO 7
| Lead performer
| Shibuya REX; Shibuya (October 6) 
|-
|INKT Live House tour 2016
| Lead performer
| total of 16 shows in various venues across Japan from October 1 - November 19, with a special additional "Xmas night" show at Kashiwa PALOOZA in Chiba on December 14<ref>{{cite web|url=https://inkt.asia/contents/65832|title=INKT live house tour 2016 ~Xmas Night~' announcement|publisher=Inkt.asia}}</ref> 
|-
|Heart Town Festival 2016
| Guest performer
| Taichung Intercontinental Baseball Stadium; Taichung, Taiwan (November 26)
|-
|UCHUSENTAI: NOIZ presents "BIG BOMBER CAMP 2016
| Guest performer
| Nagoya ell.FITS ALL; Nagoya (November 30) 
|-
|Beach Walker 2016
| Guest performer
| Harbor Studio; Kobe (December 9) 
|-
|Pulse Factory presents "Life with a mortality rate of 100%" live
| Guest performer
| Umeda Zeela; Osaka (December 10) 
|-
|Tokyo Lalara vol. 6
| Guest performer
| Hatsudai DOORS; Tokyo (December 16) 
|-
|Gacharic Spin × INKT live
| Lead performer
| Nagoya ell.FITS ALL (December 22) 
|-
|TONEAYU Presents "watered down PARTY! ~ Lack of oxygen speeding the old year SPECIAL ~"
| Lead performer
| Shibuya GUILTY; Shibuya (December 29) 
|-
|PALOOZA presents "Brand New Vibe Road to Zepp Divercity Special Countdown Party to 2017"
| Guest performer
| Kashiwa PALOOZA (December 31) 
|-
|rowspan="10"|2017
|KING presents "KING OF ROCK SHOW New Year Special
| Guest performer
| Kashiwa PALOOZA (January 7) 
|-
|L & P Attractive presents "All Happiness !! Extra edition" [Sushi Fest]
| Guest performer
| Osu RAD HALL; Nagoya (February 3) 
|-
|Nagoya Large Circuit Festival RAD CREATION presents "Tora Rock Festival 2017"
| Guest performer
| this festival had several shows at various different venues in Aichi Prefecture, but INKT only guest performed at 1 show on February 4 
|-
|Muscle King Party ~ MTR Birthday Festival ~
| Guest performer
| TSUTAYA O-WEST (February 16) 
|-
|"Wicked!!!" live
| Guest performer
| Daikanyama LOOP; Tokyo (February 17) 
|-
|Palooza presents "Bakugan Festival"
| Lead performer
| Kashiwa PALOOZA (February 25) 
|-
|HateItOrLoveIt & Club Lizard Yokohama Presents "Rabbit's Revenge Vol.4" Club Lizard 15th Anniversary & Closure live
| Guest performer
| Club Lizard; Yokohama (March 10) 
|-
|INKT Live house tour 2017
| Lead performer
| almost 50 shows held at many different venues across Japan from March 4 - July 23  
|-
|PALOOZA meets WHITE SHADOW "SHADOW NET" live
| Lead performer
| Kashiwa PALOOZA (May 11) 
|-
|Knock Out Kashiwa Idiot" live
| Lead performer
| Kashiwa PALOOZA (December 31)
|-
|rowspan="1"|2018
|Hide tribute 2018
| Guest performer
| Kashiwa PALOOZA (May 5 & 6) 
|-
|rowspan="7"|2019
|Tanaka Koki presents Easter TOUR 2019
| Lead performer
| Koki Tanaka's first national solo tour held at various venues across Japan from February 2 to April 6.  
|-
|The Last Day of Heisei! Epikkus FES!
| Guest performer
| Zepp DiverCity TOKYO (April 30) 
|-
|Natsu no Mamono by SILLYTHING 
| Guest performer
| Tokyo CLUB LINER (June 2)  
|-
|KOKI TANAKA "THE ONE MAN ~ 0 ~" 
| Lead performer
| Tanaka's one-man live tour with 3 shows held in Tokyo, Osaka and Aichi from August 3–11  
|-
|Reiwa First Summer 
| Lead performer
| Shibuya Eggman; Tokyo (August 31) 
|-
|Natsu no Mamono 2019 
| Guest performer
| Saitama Tobu Zoo (September 28)  
|-
|KOKI TANAKA "LOUDER" tour 
| Lead performer
| Tanaka's national live tour with 14 shows held across Japan from October 5 to November 4 
|-
|}

Stage shows

 Filmography 

 Film 

Television

 Other works 

Books
 田中聖 10845: Released on July 15, 2015

 Awards 

 50th Television Drama Academy Awards: Best Supporting Actor for My Boss My Hero (2006)
 2006 TVNavi Awards: Best Newcomer'' for My Boss My Hero (2006)

References

External links
 Koki Tanaka official website 
 Koki Tanaka's official Youtube channel
 Koki Tanaka's official Twitter
 INKT official website 
 
 Koki Tanaka at JDorama.com

1985 births
Living people
Horikoshi High School alumni
Josai International University alumni
Johnny & Associates
KAT-TUN members
Japanese male pop singers
Japanese male rock singers
Japanese alternative rock musicians
Japanese male actors
21st-century Japanese singers
21st-century Japanese male singers